Kowdiar Palace in Thiruvananthapuram, Kerala, India was built in 1934 by Maharajah Sree Chithira Thirunal Balarama Varma, on Pallikettu (wedding) of his only sister, Maharani Karthika Thirunal Lakshmi Bayi with Lt. Col. G. V. Raja. After the Constitutional Amendment of 1971, the properties and estates of the royal family were partitioned and divided equally among the branches of the two Travancore Queens, Sethu Lakshmi Bayi and Sethu Parvathi Bayi. This Palace belongs to the heirs of Sethu Parvathi Bayi as it was built by her son Maharajah Sree Chithira Thirunal.

Kowdiar Palace's architectural work is famous and has over 150 rooms. The entry to this palace is restricted as it is the private residence of the royal family settled in Thiruvananthapuram.

See also
 Travancore Royal Family
 Princely State
 Vellayambalam

References

External links

 A visit to Kowdiar Palace - Part 1 Youtube.com
 Zonkerala
 India9
 Tour Kowdiar palace

Royal residences in India
Palaces in Thiruvananthapuram
Travancore royal family
Houses completed in 1934
1934 establishments in India
20th-century architecture in India